is the chronicle of Oda Nobunaga, compiled in the early Edo period based on records kept by , a warrior who followed Nobunaga.  covers events from 1568, when Nobunaga entered Kyoto, until Nobunaga died in 1582. The compiled chronicle consists of 16 volumes and is considered by historians to be "mostly factual" and "reliable". The chronicle is not only often quoted on subjects related to Nobunaga, but on other subjects, too, such as the art of tea.

Reflecting the popularity of Oda Nobunaga, versions of the chronicle re-written in modern Japanese have sold nearly ten thousand copies all together.

Notes

References 
 
 "Welcome to the world of the account of 'Shinchou Kouki'" (defunct; link via the Wayback Machine)

Daimyo
Warlords
Oda clan
Edo-period works
16th-century history books
History books about the 16th  century
Edo-period history books